The 1982 Italian Grand Prix was a Formula One motor race held at Monza on 12 September 1982. This was the final pole position, podium, finish, and points for 1978 World Champion Mario Andretti at this race. René Arnoux won the race. Arnoux announced he would be replacing Andretti at Ferrari in 1983. Arnoux finished ahead of his Ferrari teammate in 1983 Patrick Tambay, and Mario Andretti in the second Ferrari finished third. John Watson's fourth place put him 9 points behind Keke Rosberg (who finished outside the points after his rear wing came off and he had to pit in order for his team to replace it) with an outside chance of winning the Drivers' Title at the final race at Caesars Palace, where Ferrari, McLaren, and Renault would battle for the Constructors' Title. Both Brabham cars ran strongly early on but dropped out after several laps due to mechanical failures, a problem that would often compromise their otherwise fast package in 1982.

Classification

Qualifying

Race

Championship standings after the race

Drivers' Championship standings

Constructors' Championship standings

Note: Only the top five positions are included for both sets of standings.

References

Italian Grand Prix
Grand Prix
Italian Grand Prix
Italian Grand Prix